Glenn Layendecker (born May 9, 1961) is a former professional tennis player from the United States.

His highest singles ranking was world No. 48 in 1990. Layendecker's highest doubles ranking was world No. 32. His career wins included wins over Andre Agassi, Michael Chang, Yannick Noah, Aaron Krickstein, Anders Järryd, and Brad Gilbert in singles matches. He also beaned John McEnroe in the temple with an approach shot at the US Open.

Layendecker graduated from Yale University in 1983.

He was the tennis coach of the Oregon Episcopal School Aardvarks. Under his coaching, the team garnered four consecutive state titles. Layendecker lives in San Mateo, California and works for the West Coast Conference.

Career finals

Doubles (1 title, 4 runner-ups)

References

External links
 
 

1961 births
Living people
People from Stanford, California
American male tennis players
Sportspeople from Lake Oswego, Oregon
Tennis people from California
Yale Bulldogs men's tennis players